Cabanne Course is a stream in St. Francois County in the U.S. state of Missouri.

Cabanne Course has the name of the local Cabanne family.

See also
List of rivers of Missouri

References

Rivers of St. Francois County, Missouri
Rivers of Missouri